Fifth Street is a Metromover station in the urban neighborhood of Brickell in Downtown, Miami, Florida.

This station is located on Southeast Fifth Street near First Avenue. It opened to service May 26, 1994.

Fifth Street station serves green spaces like Brickell Park and the Miami River Greenway, as well as towering residential buildings such as Brickell on the River, Icon Brickell, and 600 Brickell Tower.

Station layout

External links
 
 MDT – Metromover Stations
 5th Street entrance from Google Maps Street View

Brickell Loop
Metromover stations
Railway stations in the United States opened in 1994
1994 establishments in Florida